The Dave Jones Stanhope Simpson Insurance Mayflower Cashspiel is an annual bonspiel, or curling tournament, held at the Mayflower Curling Club in Halifax, Nova Scotia. It has been held annually since 2013 as a men's and women's tour event. The tournament is held in a triple knockout format on the men's side and a round robin format on the women's side.

Previous names
 2013–2014: Dave Jones Molson Mayflower Cashspiel
 2015: Dave Jones Stanhope Simpson Mayflower Cashspiel (men's) & Dave Jones Northbridge Mayflower Cashspiel (women's)
 2016: Dave Jones Mayflower Cashspiel
 2017–2018: Dave Jones Alexander Keith's Mayflower Cashspiel (men's) & Dave Jones Stanhope Simpson Insurance Mayflower Cashspiel (women's)
 2019–present: Dave Jones Stanhope Simpson Insurance Mayflower Cashspiel

Past champions

Men

Women

References

2013 establishments in Nova Scotia
Curling competitions in Halifax, Nova Scotia